John Grieve (April 15, 1852 – November 17, 1920) was an English-born farmer, manufacturer and political figure in Ontario. He represented Middlesex North in the Legislative Assembly of Ontario from 1914 to 1919 as a Liberal member.

He was born in Folkestone, the son of Thomas Grieve and Elizabeth Main, both of Scottish descent, and came to Canada in 1862. In 1875, he married Caroline I. Wilson. Grieve was president of the Parkhill Lumber and Manufacturing Company. He ran unsuccessfully for a seat in the Ontario assembly in 1911. He died in 1920.

References

External links

1852 births
1920 deaths
Ontario Liberal Party MPPs